Eoin Ó Broin (born 1972) is an Irish Sinn Féin politician and writer who has been a Teachta Dála (TD) for Dublin Mid-West constituency since the 2016 general election.

Background
Ó Broin is from Cabinteely, County Dublin. He was educated at Crown Woods School and Blackrock College. He holds a degree in Cultural Studies from the University of East London and an MA in Irish Politics from Queen's University Belfast. For a period in the late 1980s he was the bassist in Dublin rock band The Foremen, with whom he performed on the RTÉ TV show Jo Maxi in 1989.

Political career
Ó Broin was elected to Belfast City Council in 2001, stepping down in 2004. He was the National Organiser of Ógra Shinn Féin between 1995 and 1997. He was Sinn Féin's Director of European Affairs co-ordinating his party's team in the European Parliament in Brussels, from 2004 to 2007. He is a former member of Sinn Féin's governing body and a regular columnist with the republican newspaper An Phoblacht.

He campaigned against the Treaty of Lisbon and spoke at the National Forum on Europe on behalf of Sinn Féin and the No 2 Lisbon campaign.

He is also a published writer. His first book, Matxinada - Basque Nationalism and Radical Basque Youth Movements was published in English in 2004 and in Spanish in 2005. His second book, Sinn Féin and the Politics of Left Republicanism was published by Pluto Press in 2009 and the launch was held in Pearse Street Public Library on 16 February 2009. Ó Broin is also the editor of Left Republican Review. As a freelance writer he has articles published in An Phoblacht, Magill, Village Magazine and The Irish Times.

He was an unsuccessful Sinn Féin candidate for the Dún Laoghaire constituency at the 2007 general election. He ran for Dublin Mid-West at the 2011 general election. He polled 5,060 votes being beaten to the last seat in the constituency by Derek Keating of Fine Gael. He subsequently declared his intention to run for the Seanad, and was defeated in his election campaign. In 2013, Ó Broin was co-opted by Sinn Féin onto South Dublin County Council to represent Clondalkin local electoral area, after sitting councillor Matthew McDonagh resigned his seat.

In the 2016 general election, he topped the poll in the Dublin Mid-West constituency with 22.7% of the first preference votes, and was elected on the first count. Mark Ward was co-opted to fill Ó Broin's seat on South Dublin County Council.

In May 2019, the election of Frances Fitzgerald TD as a Member of the European Parliament created a vacancy in the Dublin Mid-West constituency. At the resulting by-election in November 2019, Ó Broin managed the campaign of the Sinn Féin candidate Mark Ward.  Wards's victory gave Sinn Féin two of the constituency's four seats.

At the general election in February 2020, Ó Broin again topped the poll, with 26.1% of the first-preference votes. He was again re-elected on the first count, and his transfers secured Mark Ward's re-election on the second count.

, Ó Broin is Sinn Féin's spokesperson on housing. In May 2019, he published a book entitled Home: Why Public Housing is the Answer which specifically addressed the issue of housing in Ireland. Home was generally well received by critics in Ireland, and became a surprise bestseller. Housing proved one of the key issues in the 2020 Irish general election and factored into Sinn Féin's significant gains in the voting.

Personal life
Ó Broin is the partner of Lynn Boylan, a Sinn Féin Senator.

Bibliography

 Matxinada. Basque Nationalism & Radical Basque Youth Movements (2008)
 Sinn Féin and the politics of left republicanism (2009)
 A Better Ireland: Arguments for a New Republic (2015)
 Home: Why Public Housing is the Answer (2019)
 Defects: Living with the Legacy of the Celtic Tiger (2021)
 The Dignity of Everyday Life: Celebrating Michael Scott’s Busáras (2021) [with Mal McCann]

References

External links
Eoin Ó Broin's page on the Sinn Féin website

 

1972 births
Living people
Alumni of Queen's University Belfast
Irish columnists
Irish magazine editors
Magill people
Members of Belfast City Council
Members of the 32nd Dáil
People educated at Blackrock College
Politicians from County Dublin
Sinn Féin TDs (post-1923)
The Irish Times people
Members of the 33rd Dáil